
White lotus can refer to:

Plants
 White waterlily, an aquatic flowering plant
 Nymphaea alba, of Europe and North Africa
 Nymphaea lotus, of East Africa and Southeast Asia
 Nymphaea nouchali, of South Asia, Southeast Asia and Australia
 Nymphaea pubescens, of South Asia and Southeast Asia

Buddhist sect
 White Lotus, a Buddhist sect which became an influential secret society in imperial China
Red Turban Rebellion, a 1351–1368 rebellion that overthrew the Yuan dynasty
White Lotus Rebellion, a 1794–1804 rebellion during the Qing dynasty

Fictional organizations loosely based on the historical organization
 White Lotus Society, a fictional organization in the video game Mortal Kombat.
 Order of the White Lotus, a fictional organization in the animated television series Avatar: The Last Airbender and The Legend of Korra
 White Lotus Society, a fictional triad holding secrets of the far past in the 2008 fantasy novel Necropolis by Anthony Horowitz.

Other uses
 White Lotus (album), a 2011 album by the American post-hardcore band Eyes Set to Kill
 Ganglamedo, also translated as White lotus, a 2006 Chinese musical film
The White Lotus, an American TV series